Caloptilia aurifasciata is a moth of the family Gracillariidae. It is known from China (Hainan, Guanxi, Fujian, Zhejiang), Hong Kong, Japan (Honshū, Kyūshū, Shikoku), Malaysia (West Malaysia) and Thailand.

The wingspan is 9.8–11 mm.

The larvae feed on Toxicodendron succedaneum and Toxicodendron sylvestre. They mine the leaves of their host plant.

References

aurifasciata
Moths of Asia
Moths described in 1982